Sorga Palsoe (Indonesian for False Heaven) is a 1941 film from the Dutch East Indies (present-day Indonesia) which was directed by Tan Tjoei Hock for Java Industrial Film. The tragedy, starring Lo Tjin Nio, Tong Hui, Lim Poen Tjiaw, and Rohana, was a commercial failure. It is likely lost.

Plot
Hian Nio is displeased as her mother, Roti, treats her poorly and favours her siblings. One day, Hian Nio's boyfriend  Kian Bie is fired from his work. Kian Bie's former employer, Bian Hong, uses the opportunity to take Hian Nio as his wife. She is, however, unhappy, and after a year abandons Bian Hong and their newborn daughter. Eventually Hian Nio returns to claim their daughter, but she dies soon afterwards.

Production
Sorga Palsoe was directed by Tan Tjoei Hock for The Teng Chun's Java Industrial Film. It was his fourth film, following Dasima, Matjan Berbisik, and Melati van Agam (all 1940). The story, which bucked a then-ongoing trend of native oriented films, was written by Fred Young; it was Young's first foray into the industry.

The film starred Lo Tjin Nio, Tong Hui, Lim Poen Tjiaw, and Rohana. Filming for the black-and-white film began on 27 December 1940 and was completed by January of the following year. Music direction was handled by Mas Sardi.

Release and reception
Sorga Palsoe was screened in Surabaya, East Java, by late February 1941 and in Medan, North Sumatra, by April. The film, targeted at uneducated, lower-class viewers, was a commercial failure. An anonymous review in the daily Soerabaijasch Handelsblad found the film to have a tragic ending and emphasised the role of ethnic Chinese in production.

The film is likely lost. The American visual anthropologist Karl G. Heider writes that all Indonesian films from before 1950 are lost. However, JB Kristanto's Katalog Film Indonesia (Indonesian Film Catalogue) records several as having survived at Sinematek Indonesia's archives, and film historian Misbach Yusa Biran writes that several Japanese propaganda films have survived at the Netherlands Government Information Service.

References

Works cited

External links

Indonesian black-and-white films
Films directed by Tan Tjoei Hock
Dutch East Indies films
Lost Indonesian films